Real Tapia Club de Fútbol is a Spanish football club based in Tapia de Casariego, in the autonomous community of Asturias. Founded in 1947 it currently plays in Tercera División – Group 2, holding home games at Estadio La Xungueira, with a 4,000-seat capacity.

History
The club promoted for the first time to Tercera División in 2005.

In February 2014, due to a heavy surge in all the Northern Spain, the main field of the club, La Xungueira, was totally busted.

Season to season

4 seasons in Tercera División

Women's team
Real Tapia created a women's football team in 2007. It always competed unconsistenly in the Regional league.

Season by season

References

External links
Official website 
Futbolme team profile 

Football clubs in Asturias
Association football clubs established in 1947
1947 establishments in Spain
Divisiones Regionales de Fútbol clubs
T